Alonzo Hereford Cushing (January 19, 1841 – July 3, 1863) was an artillery officer in the Union Army during the American Civil War. He was killed in action during the Battle of Gettysburg while defending the Union position on Cemetery Ridge against Pickett's Charge. In 2013, 150 years after Cushing's death, he was nominated for the Medal of Honor. The nomination was approved by the United States Congress, and was sent for review by the Defense Department and the President.

On August 26, 2014, the White House announced he would be posthumously awarded the Medal of Honor, with President Obama presiding over the official ceremony on November 6, 2014. Helen Bird Loring Ensign, a first cousin once removed, accepted the medal on Cushing's behalf, as Cushing left no direct descendants.

Early life
Cushing was born in what is now the city of Delafield, Wisconsin and raised in Fredonia, New York. His younger brother was future Union Navy officer Cdr. William B. Cushing. They were the youngest of four brothers who eventually served in the Union forces. Their brother Howard was killed during the Indian Wars campaign in 1871.

Civil War service

Cushing graduated from the United States Military Academy in the class of June 1861, and received commissions as second and first lieutenant on the same day. He was brevetted major following the Battle of Chancellorsville. Cushing commanded Battery A, 4th U.S. Artillery at Gettysburg, and was hailed by contemporaries as heroic in his actions on the third day of the battle. He was wounded three times. First, a shell fragment went straight through his shoulder. He was then grievously wounded by a second shell fragment, which tore into his abdomen and groin. This wound exposed his intestines, which he held in place with his hand as he continued to command his battery. After these injuries, a higher-ranking officer said, "Cushing, go to the rear." Cushing, due to the limited number of men left, refused to fall back. The severity of his wounds left him unable to yell his orders above the sounds of battle. Thus, he was held aloft by his 1st Sergeant Frederick Füger, who faithfully passed on Cushing's commands. Cushing was killed when a bullet entered his mouth and exited through the back of his skull. He died on the field at the height of the assault. He was 22 years old.

His body was returned to his family and then interred in the West Point Cemetery in Section 26, Row A, Grave 7. His headstone bears, at the behest of his mother, Mary, the inscription "Faithful unto Death." His grave is next to that of Major General John Buford, another hero of Gettysburg, who had chosen the battlefield that Cushing had died defending.

Cushing was posthumously cited for gallantry with a brevet promotion to lieutenant colonel.

Medal of Honor

Cushing was nominated for a belated award of the Medal of Honor, beginning with a letter campaign in the late 1980s by a constituent of Senator William Proxmire of Wisconsin. Margaret Zerwekh began her campaign to honor Cushing in 1987 with a letter to Senator Proxmire.  She lived on property once owned by Cushing's father in Delafield, Wisconsin and spent years researching his background.  For years, she received form letters in return to her letters advocating for Cushing until the early 2000s.  The measure was also advocated by Congressman Ron Kind of Wisconsin's 3rd congressional district. In 2002, Senator Russ Feingold (D-WI) nominated Cushing for the Medal of Honor and, following a lengthy investigation, the U.S. Army approved the nomination in February 2010.  In order for the medal to be awarded, it had to be approved by the United States Congress. It was announced on May 20, 2010 that Cushing would receive the Medal of Honor, 147 years after his death.

However, the provision granting Cushing the Medal of Honor was removed from a defense spending bill by Senator Jim Webb (D-VA) in December 2012. In December 2013, the Senate passed a defense bill that included a provision granting Cushing the Medal of Honor. The nomination was sent to the Defense Department for review, before being approved by President Barack Obama. On August 26, 2014, the White House announced Cushing would be posthumously awarded the Medal of Honor. On November 6, 2014, 151 years after Alonzo Cushing's death, President Obama presented the award at a ceremony at the White House, attended by two dozen relatives of the Cushing family.
Cushing was awarded the Medal of Honor by Department of the Army General Order (DAGO) 2014-76 dated December 19, 2014.

Medal of Honor Citation

Legacy
Alonzo H. Cushing Camp #5 of the Sons of Union Veterans of the Civil War serves the Ozaukee County region of Wisconsin.

A small state park in Delafield was dedicated to the memory of Cushing and two of his brothers, William and Howard. While the park remains dedicated to the memory of the Cushing brothers, it is now the property of the City of Delafield.

Cushing Elementary School in Delafield (part of the Kettle Moraine School District) is also named after the brothers.

A stone monument in honor of Cushing marks the spot where he was killed during the Battle of Gettysburg. The marker is located on Cemetery Ridge, along Hancock Avenue, at The Angle.

In 2015, the Commandery-in-Chief of the Military Order of the Loyal Legion of the United States (MOLLUS) posthumously elected Lieutenant Cushing as a companion of the Order.

NFL Houston Texans linebacker Brian Cushing is a distant relative of Alonzo Cushing and his brothers. 

Stephen Vincent Benet's poem "John Brown's Body" contains a stanza commemorating Cushing's death at Gettysburg:

"Cushing ran down the last of his guns to the battle-line.

The rest had been smashed to scrap by Lee's artillery fire.

He held his guts in his hand as the charge came up to the wall,

And his gun spoke out for him once before he fell to the ground."

See also
List of Medal of Honor recipients for the Battle of Gettysburg
List of American Civil War Medal of Honor recipients: A–F

Notes

References
 Brown, Kent Masterson. Cushing of Gettysburg. Lexington: University Press of Kentucky, 1993; .

Further reading
 Fuger, Frederick. 1908. "Cushing's Battery at Gettysburg". Journal of the Military Service Institution of the United States. p. 41.
 Haight, Theron Wilber. Three Wisconsin Cushings: A Sketch of the Lives of Howard B., Alonzo H. and William B. Cushing, Children of a Pioneer Family of Waukesha County, Wisconsin. Madison: Wisconsin History Commission, 1910. .
 Langworthy, Todd. The Cushing Boys of Fredonia: Soldiers of the Civil War. [S.l: s.n.], 2009. 
 "Winning a Battle to Honor a Civil War Hero", New York Times, June 11, 2010; accessed November 7, 2014.

External links

 Army.mil Spotlight
 Battery A, 4th U.S. Artillery – The Civil War Artillery Compendium

1841 births
1863 deaths
Union Army officers
American Civil War recipients of the Medal of Honor
People of New York (state) in the American Civil War
People of Wisconsin in the American Civil War
People from Delafield, Wisconsin
People from Fredonia, New York
United States Military Academy alumni
United States Army officers
United States Army Medal of Honor recipients
Burials at West Point Cemetery
Union military personnel killed in the American Civil War